L. chinense may refer to:
 Liriodendron chinense, the Chinese tulip tree, a tree species native to Asia
 Loropetalum chinense, the Chinese fringe flower, a plant species
 Lycium chinense, a plant species

See also